Tennis at the 2013 Canada Summer Games was in Sherbrooke, Quebec at the Centre récréatif Rock Forest. It was held from the 3 to 7 August.

Medal table
The following is the medal table for rowing at the 2013 Canada Summer Games.

Results

References

External links 

2013 Canada Summer Games
2013 in tennis
2013 Canada Summer Games